The 1982 FA Cup final was the 101st final of the FA Cup and took place on 22 May 1982 at Wembley Stadium. It was contested between Tottenham Hotspur and Queens Park Rangers.

Tottenham were the cup holders and were hot favourites, while QPR had narrowly missed out on promotion from the Second Division.

It would be the last final involving a team from outside the top flight for ten years.

Tottenham's victory meant that they had then won the FA Cup seven times – matching the record set by Aston Villa 25 years earlier. It also preserved their unbeaten record in FA Cup finals.

Tottenham's Argentinian players Ricky Villa and Osvaldo Ardiles did not play due to the Falklands War. Ardiles was away on international duty and due to the war was unable to return to London, so Tottenham loaned him to French club Paris Saint-Germain. Villa said he decided not to play in the final because of the ongoing Falklands War.

Road to Wembley

Match summary
The first game was a tense and largely dull game of few clear cut chances. QPR's young goalkeeper Peter Hucker was certainly the busier keeper although Spurs were mainly being kept to long range efforts. Hucker's performance in the first match would ultimately earn him the Man of the Match award. QPR were not outclassed however, although their attacking options were hindered when prolific striker Clive Allen, who had scored the winner in the semi-final, was injured early in the game and was a peripheral figure thereafter. He was replaced by Gary Micklewhite five minutes into the second half. Ninety minutes came and went with the score 0–0. With ten minutes of extra time remaining, Glenn Hoddle found himself just outside the QPR penalty box. His shot took a deflection (off Tony Currie) and found the right-hand corner of Hucker's goal. Not to be outdone, five minutes later Simon Stainrod took a long throw ten yards from the Spurs goal line. Rangers' burly centre-back Bob Hazell, flicked the ball on at the near post and Terry Fenwick headed the ball past Spurs keeper Ray Clemence at point-blank range, making the final score 1–1.

Replay

The replay took place at Wembley five days later. Clive Allen had not recovered from his injury and his replacement on the Saturday, Gary Micklewhite, started the game. Early in the game after only six minutes had elapsed, the Spurs midfielder Graham Roberts broke through into the Rangers penalty area. Rangers' captain on the evening, Tony Currie (regular captain Glenn Roeder was suspended), made a lunge to get the ball but only succeeded in bringing Roberts down. It was a clear penalty. Glenn Hoddle coolly slotted the penalty away sending Peter Hucker the wrong way. QPR soon managed to get into the game though and before long had the ball in the net by Micklewhite, but the goal was disallowed for an offside against Stainrod. It was fair to say that for  much of the rest of the game they were the better side, taking the game to their more highly fancied opponents. The only thing they could not manage to do was score. The closest they came was in the second half when John Gregory received a raking long pass from the left wing from Simon Stainrod and spotted Spurs keeper Ray Clemence slightly off his line. Gregory's audacious volleyed chip from just inside the box however, agonisingly hit the crossbar and bounced to safety. Steve Archibald hit the post late on for Spurs but Hoddle's early penalty remained the only goal, and Spurs retained the trophy just as they had done in 1962. Spurs became the only team to win three FA Cup Final replays, as well as the only team to win FA Cup Final replays in successive years.

Match details

Replay

Cup final song
The Tottenham Hotspur squad recorded a cup final song for the 1982 final – "Tottenham Tottenham".

References

External links
Match report at fa-cupfinals.co.uk
 1981–82 F.A Cup Results at soccerbase.com
 1982 Cup Final at sportingchronicle.com

Final
FA Cup Finals
FA Cup Final 1982
FA Cup Final 1982
FA Cup Final
FA Cup Final